KFNW may refer to:

KFNW (AM), a radio station (1200 AM) licensed to West Fargo, North Dakota, United States
KFNW-FM, a radio station (97.9 FM) licensed to Fargo, North Dakota, United States